Statistics of Empress's Cup in the 1991 season.

Overview
It was contested by 20 teams, and Suzuyo Shimizu FC Lovely Ladies won the championship.

Results

1st round
Toyama Ladies SC 0-3 Fujita Tendai SC Mercury
Ishinomaki Women's Commercial High School 1-0 Osaka University of Health and Sport Sciences
Ube Super Ladies 0-4 Ozu High School
Matsushita Electric LSC Bambina 0-0 (pen 3-0) Shiroki FC Serena

2nd round
Yomiuri SC Beleza 3-0 Fujita Tendai SC Mercury
Sagamihara LSC 1-2 Asahi Kokusai Bunnys
Nissan FC 11-0 Shibecha Ladies
Ishinomaki Women's Commercial High School 0-5 Nikko Securities Dream Ladies
Prima Ham FC Kunoichi 7-0 Ozu High School
Uwajima Minami High School 0-2 Tasaki Kobe
Shinko Seiko FC Clair 0-0 (pen 4-2) Nippon Sport Science University
Matsushita Electric LSC Bambina 0-3 Suzuyo Shimizu FC Lovely Ladies

Quarterfinals
Yomiuri SC Beleza 3-0 Asahi Kokusai Bunnys
Nissan FC 2-1 Nikko Securities Dream Ladies
Prima Ham FC Kunoichi 3-1 Tasaki Kobe
Shinko Seiko FC Clair 0-5 Suzuyo Shimizu FC Lovely Ladies

Semifinals
Yomiuri SC Beleza 4-0 Nissan FC
Prima Ham FC Kunoichi 0-1 Suzuyo Shimizu FC Lovely Ladies

Final
Suzuyo Shimizu FC Lovely Ladies 3-1 Yomiuri SC Beleza
Suzuyo Shimizu FC Lovely Ladies won the championship.

References

Empress's Cup
1991 in Japanese women's football